"Remember Everything" is a song by American heavy metal band Five Finger Death Punch. The song was released as the third single from their third album American Capitalist, and their twelfth single overall. The song ranked second on the Hot Mainstream Rock Tracks chart, 10th on the Billboard Rock Songs chart and 25th on the Billboard Alternative Songs chart.
"Remember Everything" was inspired by a song that Jason and Jeremy heard on the radio at a restaurant.

Premise
In an interview with Melissa Maria of Rat TV, lead vocalist Ivan Moody stated that he wrote the song, to talk about torments in his history. Moody stated that he and his parents never agreed on anything, that his mother still disapproves of his career in music, and that writing the song was a way of getting those thoughts out in the open.

Video
The video, directed by Emile Levisetti, begins with a young child in white clothing drawing on a white floor surrounded by white walls. He begins drawing what he remembers in his life, including his home, parents, and events. It is hinted that he's abused and his father is an alcoholic. He continues drawing his memories as he grows. He gets married, joins the military, and returns to a less than perfect life. In the white room, he is shown having fits of rage and angst throughout the video. Eventually, he grows old and passes away in a hospital. Just as he dies, he drops a fifty cent coin (shown previously hanging from his carseat as an infant) and a janitor pockets it. He is then shown entering the white room (presumably heaven) as a child again.

The members of Five Finger Death Punch are not seen performing the song, although they are spotted in the video.

Track listing

Charts

Weekly charts

Year-end charts

Personnel
 Zoltan Bathory – guitars
 Jason Hook – guitars, backing vocals
 Ivan Moody – vocals
 Chris Kael – bass, backing vocals
 Jeremy Spencer – drums

References

External links
 
  Official music video

Five Finger Death Punch songs
2011 singles
2011 songs
Song recordings produced by Kevin Churko
Songs written by Kevin Churko
Songs written by Zoltan Bathory
Songs written by Ivan Moody (vocalist)
Songs written by Jason Hook
Songs written by Jeremy Spencer (drummer)
Songs written by Kane Churko
Rock ballads